Bedawi may refer to:

Northwest Arabian Arabic, or Bedawi Arabic
Beja language, also called Bedawi
Western Egyptian Bedawi Arabic

See also
 Betawi (disambiguation)